Staffin Island (possibly also known as Stenscholl Island) is an uninhabited islet off the east coast of the Trotternish peninsula of Skye in Scotland.

The Norse name may have been Fladdaidh meaning "flat island". The Gaelic name Eilean Stafainn has the same meaning as the modern English name which is taken from the nearby settlement of Staffin.

In 2011 it was reported that the island may be the last in Scotland where the old tradition of having cattle swim between grazings is still carried out. 
Crofter Iain MacDonald, who used to swim with the animals, now uses a boat to encourage them  to swim from Staffin Island to Skye in early spring and back again in October.

"The Hut on Staffin Island" is a tune composed by Phil Cunningham.

See also
 Flodday

Notes

References

 
 

Uninhabited islands of Highland (council area)